The Maeght Foundation or Fondation Maeght is a museum of modern art on the Colline des Gardettes, a hill overlooking Saint-Paul de Vence in the southeast of France about  from Nice. It was established by Marguerite and Aimé Maeght in 1964 and houses paintings, sculptures, collages, ceramics and all forms of modern art. 

The collection includes works by many important 20th-century artists including Jean Arp, Pierre Bonnard, Georges Braque, Alexander Calder, Marc Chagall, Sam Francis, Alberto Giacometti, Wassily Kandinsky, Ellsworth Kelly, Fernand Léger, Anne Madden and Joan Miró among others.

The building was designed by the Spanish architect Josep Lluís Sert, houses more than 12,000 pieces of art and attracts "on average, 200,000 visitors ... every year". There is a small chapel dedicated to Saint Bernard, in memory of Bernard, the son of Aimé and Marguerite Maeght who died of leukemia, aged eleven. The foundation is entirely independently funded with no reliance on state subsidies. Adrien Maeght is the chairman of the foundation's administrative council, which also includes Isabelle Maeght and her sister Yoyo Maeght.

See also
 Labyrinth (Joan Miró) — sculpture installation at the museum.
 Nuits de la Fondation Maeght Vol. 1 (1970) by Albert Ayler
 Fondation Maeght Nights, Volume 1 & 2 (1970) by Sun Ra Arkestra

References

External links

 http://www.fondation-maeght.com
 http://www.maeght.com

Art museums and galleries in France
Museums in Alpes-Maritimes
Modern art museums
Art museums established in 1964
1964 establishments in France
Joan Miró
Maeght